Langlade may refer to:

Places 
 Langlade, Wisconsin, a town, United States
 Langlade (community), Wisconsin, an unincorporated community, United States
 Langlade County, Wisconsin, United States
 Langlade, Gard, a commune in the Gard département of France
 Langlade Island, in French Atlantic archipelago of Saint-Pierre and Miquelon

People 
 François Langlade, French catholic priest
 Augustin Langlade, a French fur-trader
 Charles Michel de Langlade, a French/Ottawa fur-trader who fought in the French and Indian War
Colette Langlade, a French politician; former MP
 Sieur de Langlade, Jean-Louis-Ignace de La Serre

Occitan-language surnames